LOBOS (Linux OS Boots OS) is a software program (or "system") that allows remote booting ("netbooting") of a personal computer without using a BIOS. It allows one kernel to boot another kernel. LOBOS is part of an effort to move away from fixed, proprietary BIOSes to systems that allow more adaptability, especially with different physical peripheral devices.

See also
 coreboot
 kexec

Sources and external links
Ronald Minnich, Advanced Computing Lab, Los Alamos National Laboratory

Linux software